The OMX Nordic 40 (OMXN40) is a stock market index for the pan-regional (virtual) Nasdaq Nordic. It is a capitalization-weighted index, created on October 2, 2006, that consists of the 40 most-traded stock classes of shares from the four stock markets operated by the OMX Group in four of the Nordic countries - Copenhagen, Helsinki, Reykjavík and Stockholm (although no Icelandic companies currently feature). The base date for the index is December 28, 2001, with a base value of 1000.

Components
As of 2020, the index is composed of the following 40 listings:

See also
Copenhagen Stock Exchange
Helsinki Stock Exchange
Stockholm Stock Exchange

References

External links
Official OMX list of OMXN40 components
OMX Nordic 40 profile via Wikinvest

European stock market indices
Nasdaq Nordic